Babes at Sea is a 1934 Color Rhapsodies film.

Plot summary
A toddler chases a frog out of his house to a nearby well where falling into the bucket, he arrives at the bottom of the well, to be magically greeted by underwater sea babies and various creatures, including the octopus law officer. Eventually, he returns to the well bucket and is raised back up to be rescued by his mother.

References

American animated short films
1930s animated short films
1934 animated films
1930s American animated films
1934 short films
Columbia Pictures short films
Screen Gems short films
Columbia Pictures animated short films
Color Rhapsody